Frostie Root Beer is an American brand of root beer that was originally produced in 1939 by The Frostie Beverage Company of Catonsville, Maryland, owned by George Rackensperger. In 1971, Frostie Enterprises, as the parent company was known, purchased a competing rootbeer brand and drive-in chain, Stewart's Restaurants (sold in 1979).  Another expansion happened in 1974, when Frostie Enterprises purchased the Dog n Suds Root Beer Drive-in and brand.

At the end of 1979, the Frostie brand was sold to the Monarch Beverage Company of Atlanta, Georgia. After years of being under-promoted by Monarch in favor of Dad's Root Beer, the Frostie brand was sold in 2000 to Leading Edge Brands of Temple, Texas. In 2009, Leading Edge Brands sold the Frostie line of beverages to Intrastate Distributors Inc. of Detroit, Michigan.

Flavors 
The Frostie line includes the following sixteen flavors:

 Root Beer
 Diet Root Beer
 Vanilla Root Beer
 Blue Cream Soda
 Cherry Limeade
 Concord Grape
 Orange
 Strawberry
 Green Apple
 Lemonade
 Pink Lemonade
 Strawberry Lemonade
 Watermelon Lemonade
 Blue Lemonade
 Ginger Ale
 Ginger Beer

See also 
Dog n Suds
Stewart's Restaurants

References

External links 
 
History of Frostie
Frostie Rootbeer Facebook

American soft drinks
Catonsville, Maryland
Maryland cuisine
Products introduced in 1939
Monarch brands
Root beer